The 1974–75 season was the 102nd season of competitive football in Scotland and the 78th season of Scottish league football. It was the final season of the old, two-division set up. At the end of the season, the top ten teams in Division One formed the new Premier Division. The remaining eight teams, together with the top six from Division Two went on to make up the new First Division. The remaining 14 teams became the new Second Division.

This season also saw Celtic's record-breaking run of nine consecutive league championships come to an end when Rangers won the last Division One league title.

Scottish League Division One

Champions: Rangers 
Relegated: See explanation above

Scottish League Division Two

Champions: Falkirk
Promotion / relegation: see explanation above

Cup honours

Other honours

National

County

 – aggregate over two legs – trophy shared

Highland League

Individual honours

Scotland national team

1975 British Home Championship – Runner Up

Key:
(H) = Home match
(A) = Away match
ECQG4 = European Championship qualifying – Group 4
BHC = British Home Championship

Notes and references

External links
Scottish Football Historical Archive

 
Seasons in Scottish football